The MG3 is a small car produced by the Chinese automotive company SAIC. The first generation, marketed as the MG3 SW, is based on the British made Rover Streetwise, which itself was based on the Rover 25, while the second generation, introduced in 2011 is marketed simply as the MG3. It is the most popular Chinese manufactured car currently on sale in the United Kingdom.



First generation (2008)

The first generation MG3 SW is essentially a rebadged version of the Rover Streetwise, which had ceased production in April 2005 after the bankruptcy of predecessor organisation MG Rover. It started production in 2008 at SAIC's Chinese factory in Pukou, Nanjing. The MG3 SW is only on sale in China, and cannot be exported by SAIC.

Engines

Second generation (2011)

The second-generation MG3 was shown at the 2010 Beijing Auto Show, in the form of the MG Zero concept car. The new model uses an all new automotive platform with a wheelbase of 2.5 m, featuring MacPherson strut front suspension and a torsion beam rear axle. The development work took place in the United Kingdom, with production initially in China.

The car went on sale in China in the spring of 2011.

MG 3 Xross 

The second generation MG3 is also available in a crossover style variant (similar to the Rover Streetwise and MG3 SW), known as the MG3 Xross. The Xross is only available with the  1.5 litre engine.

Facelift (2013) 

A restyled version of the MG3, with a revised front design, was announced in the spring of 2013, with sales in the United Kingdom beginning in September 2013, but only with the 1.5 litre  engine option.

It was claimed that it would be built for Europe at the Longbridge plant in Birmingham alongside the larger MG6. The MG3 was assembled there from 2014 until 2016.

For 2016, the MG3 received several alterations to improve it: the installation of an EU 6 derivative of the standard 1.5-litre engine, developed by SAIC Motor UK, a stop start was fitted, and two-tone colour schemes, primarily on the red and yellow MG3's which can have either a black or white roof, were offered as options.

Engines 
The MG 3 is only available with a 1.5-litre engine, which has received an EU 6 upgrade to reduce emissions, and also the addition of stop start.

MG3 Trophy 

MG unveiled the MG3 Trophy Championship concept car at the MG90 event at Silverstone in June 2014.

The MG3 Trophy Championship concept, based on the MG3 production vehicle platform and created to highlight in-house engineering, design and calibration capabilities by SMTC UK at Longbridge, continues the MG tradition of club racing.

The racing concept was created solely by a team of engineers, managed by Vehicle Engineering Specialist Adrian Guyll, and based at SAIC Motor's European Design and Technical Centre (SMTC), located alongside MG Motor UK at the Longbridge site in Birmingham.

Specifications:

  (increased from 106 PS) 
 Torque 250 Nm (increased from 136 Nm) 
 Boost 1.0 Bar 
 1.5 Vti Tech engine 
 Full body-lightening programme without compromising on stiffness 
 Limited slip differential 
 Fully adjustable Macpherson strut front set up 
 Bespoke anti-roll bar 
 Adjustable front splitter 
 Twin plane adjustable rear spoiler

Second facelift (2018)

The MG3 was revised in 2018 with a facelift to the exterior and a new interior. The interior redesign now includes space for an eight-inch touchscreen unit, which is fitted as standard to some models. The 1.5-litre engine received minor modifications to bring it up to EU 6D standards, and now rated at 140g/km for  emissions. Chinese models are available with a slightly more powerful 1.5 litre engine option mated to a four speed automatic gearbox. In Thailand, the MG3 was launched on 21 June 2018. The models were only in 1.5L engine and four speed automatic. Transmission included 1.5 C, 1.5 D, 1.5 X Sunroof and 1.5 V Sunroof. In Brunei, the MG 3 was launched since the middle of 2019. The models were only in 1.5L engine and four speed automatic. Transmission included Core and Excite.

Safety 
The MG3 was crash tested by Euro NCAP in 2014, receiving a score of 3 out of 5 stars for safety, with a 69% score for adult protection (lower than the 90% result for the Mitsubishi Mirage), which was valid in accordance with Euro NCAP's testing standards until June 2020. According to analysis of the results of multiple crash tests by Euro NCAP, a number of issues were found including the driver's head bottoming out on the steering wheel through the airbag; "The passenger compartment remained stable in the frontal impact. The airbags of both the driver and the passenger were not sufficiently inflated to prevent the head 'bottoming out', through the fabric of the airbag, against the steering wheel and dashboard, respectively. [...] However, structures in the dashboard were considered a risk to occupants of different sizes or to those sat in different positions and protection of the knee/femur/pelvis area was rated as marginal". In a rear impact test, the crash test dummy measurements produced marginal results for front seat whiplash protection, and poor protection for rear seat occupants, the lowest score possible.

The facelifted MG3 did not involve a change to the basic architecture underpinning the vehicle, with the design carrying over the same overall shape, and thus the protection afforded by the chassis has not changed throughout the production of the second generation MG3. The rating of 3 out of 5 stars remained unchanged during Euro NCAP's annual review in July 2018, for the facelifted variant.

The MG3 has not been crash tested, nor rated by ANCAP. The facelifted variant lacks any active safety features such as autonomous emergency braking, instead including basic safety provisions such as six airbags (two prior to the facelift), passenger airbag cut off switch, emergency braking assistance, electronic stability control, active cornering brake control system, hill hold control, ABS with electronic brakes, automatic door unlocking in case of accidents, front disk brakes, tyre pressure monitoring, speed sensitive door locking, ultra-high tensile steel body, seat belt warning alarm and vehicle immobilizer.

An MG3 was tested by ASEAN NCAP in May 2018, producing a poor score of 2 stars out of a possible 5, with the car receiving a score of 0 in the frontal impact test due to poor protection of the driver's head, causing it to bottom out through the airbag as found in Euro NCAP's testing. Contrastingly, ASEAN NCAP found that the test vehicle protected the occupant's legs better, "The model was tested by Euro NCAP in 2014 however, the performance for both NCAPs are different. In ASEAN NCAP test, the MG3 performed better in the lower legs area. Nevertheless, the driver's head sustained serious injury compared to Euro NCAP's."

Sales

References

External links

3
2010s cars
MG 3 (first generation)
MG 3 (second generation)
Subcompact cars
Front-wheel-drive vehicles
Hatchbacks
Cars of China
ASEAN NCAP superminis
Euro NCAP superminis